Kellion Knibb (born 25 December 1993) is a Jamaican athlete specialising in the discus throw. She represented her country at the 2016 Summer Olympics without posting a valid throw in the qualification round. She also competed at the 2014 Commonwealth Games finishing sixth.

Her personal best in the event is 62.07 metres set in Philadelphia in 2017. This is the current national record.

International competitions

References

1993 births
Living people
Jamaican female discus throwers
Athletes (track and field) at the 2014 Commonwealth Games
Athletes (track and field) at the 2016 Summer Olympics
Olympic athletes of Jamaica
Commonwealth Games competitors for Jamaica
People from Saint Catherine Parish
Florida State Seminoles women's track and field athletes
Jamaican expatriates in the United States
20th-century Jamaican women
21st-century Jamaican women